Bille is a given name. Notable people with the name include:

Bille August (born 1948), Danish film and television director
Bille Eltringham, British film and television director
Bille Woodruff, American music and film director
Nicki Bille Nielsen (born 1988), Danish footballer

Bille can also be used as an abbreviation (nickname) of the name Sibylle (given female name).

See also
Bille Brown (1952–2013), Australian actor and playwright